Juvenile hyaline fibromatosis (also known as "Fibromatosis hyalinica multiplex juvenilis," "Murray–Puretic–Drescher syndrome") is a very rare, autosomal recessive disease due to mutations in capillary morphogenesis protein-2 (CMG-2 gene). It occurs from early childhood to adulthood, and presents as slow-growing, pearly white or skin-colored dermal or subcutaneous papules or nodules on the face, scalp, and back, which may be confused clinically with neurofibromatosis. The World Health Organization, 2020, reclassified the papules and nodules that occur in juvenile hyaline firbromatosis as one of the specific benign types of tumors in the category of fibroblastic and myofibroblastic tumors.

Presentation

This condition is characterised by abnormal growth of hyalinized fibrous tissue with cutaneous, mucosal, osteoarticular and systemic involvement.

Clinical features include extreme pain at minimal handling in a newborn, gingival hypertrophy, subcutaneous nodules, painful joint stiffness and contractures, muscle weakness and hypotonia.

Genetics

This condition is due to mutations in the anthrax toxin receptor-2 (ANTXR2) gene. This gene is also known as capillary morphogenesis protein-2.

This gene is located on the long arm of chromosome 4 (4q21.21).

Management

There is no presently known curative treatment for this condition.

Management is supportive

Prognosis

This is very poor with a median age at death of 15 months.

Epidemiology

84 cases have been reported as of 2018.

See also 
 List of cutaneous conditions

References

External links 

Dermal and subcutaneous growths